The United Kingdom had a diplomatic representative to the three sovereign Hanseatic cities of Bremen, Hamburg and Lübeck until German unification in 1871.  The envoy was usually only a resident, but sometimes he was also minister plenipotentiary to Lower Saxony.  He was usually resident at Hamburg, which had long been an important port for British trade, and the staple port of the Company of Merchant Adventurers of London.

Heads of Mission

Residents

1689–1700: Sir Paul Rycaut
1702–1713: John Wich Envoy Extraordinary from 1709
1707–1709: Dr John Robinson (Envoy Extraordinary to Sweden) was resident in Hamburg
1713–1741: Cyril Wich or Wyche Chargé d'Affaires 1713–1714; Resident 1714–1719; Minister 1719–1725; Envoy Extraordinary 1712–1741; created a Baronet in 1729
1741–1756: James Cope
1757–1763: Philip Stanhope
1762–1763: Robert Colbrooke

Residents to the Hanse Towns and minister plenipotentiary to Lower Saxony
1763–1772: Ralph Woodford
1772–1790: Emmanuel Matthias
1790–1798: Charles Henry Fraser
1798–1803: Sir James Crauford, Bt, also to Denmark and Meckenburg
1803–1805: Sir George Rumbold, Bt
1805–1807: Edward Thornton
1807–1813: No diplomatic relations during the Continental System
1813: Alexander Cockburn Special Mission
1815–1820: Alexander Cockburn Envoy Extraordinary
1820–1823: Joseph Charles Mellish Chargé d'Affaires
1823–1836: No diplomatic representation
1836–1841: Henry Canning Chargé d'Affaires
1841–60: Colonel George Lloyd Hodges Chargé d'Affaires
1860–70: John Ward Chargé d'Affaires and Consul-General

See also 
 History of Hamburg
 List of diplomatic missions in Hamburg

References 

United Kingdom
United Kingdom
Diplomats, United Kingdom
Hanseatic Cities
Hanseatic League
United Kingdom